Ceuta, Melilla and the Plazas de Soberanía are territories under Spanish sovereignty in or off the coast of Northern Africa. Mammals recorded in these territories and their conservation status are listed below. The taxonomy and naming of the individual species is based on those used in existing Wikipedia articles as of 21 May 2007 and supplemented by the common names and taxonomy from the IUCN, Smithsonian Institution, or University of Michigan where no Wikipedia article was available.

The following tags are used to highlight each species' conservation status as assessed by the International Union for Conservation of Nature.

Some species were assessed using an earlier set of criteria. Species assessed using this system have the following instead of near threatened and least concern categories:

Subclass: Theria

Infraclass: Eutheria

Order: Macroscelidea (elephant shrews)

Elephant shrews are small insectivorous mammals native to Africa and members of the superorder Afrotheria. Their name derives from their elongated noses resembling the trunks of elephants, to whom they are distantly related.

Family: Macroscelididae
Genus: Elephantulus
North African elephant shrew, E. rozeti LC

Order: Rodentia (rodents)

Rodents make up the largest order of mammals, with over 40% of mammalian species. They have two incisors in the upper and lower jaw which grow continually and must be kept short by gnawing.

Suborder: Hystricomorpha
Infraorder: Hystricognathi
Family: Hystricidae (Old World porcupines)
Subfamily: Hystricinae
Genus: Hystrix
 Crested porcupine, H. cristata LC
Suborder: Sciurognathi
Family: Gliridae (dormice)
Subfamily: Leithiinae
Genus: Eliomys
 Maghreb garden dormouse, Eliomys munbyanus LC
Suborder: Myomorpha
Family: Cricetidae (hamsters, voles, lemmings)
Family: Muridae (mice and rats)
Subfamily: Gerbillinae
Genus: Dipodillus
 North African gerbil, Dipodillus campestris LC
Subfamily: Murinae
Genus: Apodemus
 Wood mouse, Apodemus sylvaticus LC
Genus: Lemniscomys
 Barbary striped grass mouse, Lemniscomys barbarus LC
Genus: Mus
 House mouse, Mus musculus LR/lc
 Algerian mouse, Mus spretus LC
Genus: Rattus
 Black rat, Rattus rattus LR/lc
 Brown rat, Rattus norvegicus LR/lc

Order: Lagomorpha (lagomorphs)

The lagomorphs comprise two families, Leporidae (hares and rabbits), and Ochotonidae (pikas). Though they can resemble rodents, and were classified as a superfamily in that order until the early 20th century, they have since been considered a separate order. They differ from rodents in a number of physical characteristics, such as having four incisors in the upper jaw rather than two.

Family: Leporidae (rabbits, hares)
Genus: Oryctolagus
 European rabbit, Oryctolagus cuniculus LR/lc VU
Genus: Lepus
 Cape hare, Lepus capensis LR/lc LC

Order: Erinaceomorpha (hedgehogs and gymnures)

The order Erinaceomorpha contains a single family, Erinaceidae, which comprise the hedgehogs and gymnures. The hedgehogs are easily recognised by their spines while gymnures look more like large rats.

Family: Erinaceidae (hedgehogs)
Subfamily: Erinaceinae
Genus: Atelerix
 North African hedgehog, Atelerix algirus LR/lc

Order: Soricomorpha (shrews, moles, and solenodons)

The "shrew-forms" are insectivorous mammals. The shrews and solenodons closely resemble mice while the moles are stout bodied burrowers.

Family: Soricidae (shrews)
Subfamily: Crocidurinae
Genus: Crocidura
 Greater white-toothed shrew, Crocidura russula LC
 Whitaker's shrew, Crocidura whitakeri LC

Order: Chiroptera (bats)

The bats' most distinguishing feature is that their forelimbs are developed as wings, making them the only mammals capable of flight. Bat species account for about 20% of all mammals.

Suborder: Microchiroptera
Family: Vespertilionidae
Subfamily: Myotinae
Genus: Myotis
 Long-fingered bat, Myotis capaccinii VU
 Geoffroy's bat, Myotis emarginatus VU
 Felten's myotis, Myotis punicus DD
Subfamily: Vespertilioninae
Genus: Barbastella
 Barbastelle, Barbastella barbastellus VU
Genus: Eptesicus
 Mediterranean serotine bat Eptesicus isabellinus DD
 Serotine bat, Eptesicus serotinus LR/lc
Genus: Hypsugo
 Savi's pipistrelle, Hypsugo savii LR/lc
Genus: Nyctalus
 Greater noctule bat, Nyctalus lasiopterus LR/nt
 Lesser noctule, Nyctalus leisleri LR/nt
Genus: Pipistrellus
 Kuhl's pipistrelle, Pipistrellus kuhlii LC
 Common pipistrelle, Pipistrellus pipistrellus LC
Subfamily: Miniopterinae
Genus: Miniopterus
 Schreibers' long-fingered bat, Miniopterus schreibersii LC VU
Family: Molossidae
Genus: Tadarida
 European free-tailed bat, Tadarida teniotis LR/lc NT
Family: Rhinolophidae
Subfamily: Rhinolophinae
Genus: Rhinolophus
 Mediterranean horseshoe bat, Rhinolophus euryale VU
 Greater horseshoe bat, Rhinolophus ferrumequinum NT
 Lesser horseshoe bat, Rhinolophus hipposideros LC NT
 Mehely's horseshoe bat, Rhinolophus mehelyi VU EN

Order: Cetacea (whales)

The order Cetacea includes whales, dolphins and porpoises. They are the mammals most fully adapted to aquatic life with a spindle-shaped nearly hairless body, protected by a thick layer of blubber, and forelimbs and tail modified to provide propulsion underwater.

Suborder: Mysticeti
Family: Balaenopteridae (rorquals)
Genus: Balaenoptera
 Fin whale, Balaenoptera physalus EN
Suborder: Odontoceti
Family: Delphinidae (marine dolphins)
Genus: Delphinus
 Short-beaked common dolphin, Delphinus delphis LR/l
Genus: Feresa
 Pygmy killer whale, Feresa attenuata DD
Genus: Globicephala
 Pilot whale, Globicephala melas LR/lc
Genus: Grampus
 Risso's dolphin, Grampus griseus DD
Genus: Orcinus
 Orca, Orcinus orca LR/cd
Genus: Pseudorca
 False killer whale, Pseudorca crassidens LR/lc
Genus: Stenella
 Striped dolphin, Stenella coeruleoalba LR/cd
Genus: Tursiops
 Common bottlenose dolphin, Tursiops truncatus LR/lc
Family: Phocoenidae (porpoises)
Genus: Phocoena
 Harbour porpoise, Phocoena phocoena VU
Family: Physeteridae (sperm whales)
Genus: Physeter
 Sperm whale, Physeter macrocephalus VU
Family: Ziphiidae (beaked whales)
Genus: Ziphius
 Cuvier's beaked whale, Ziphius cavirostris DD

Order: Carnivora (carnivorans)

There are over 260 species of carnivorans, the majority of which feed primarily on meat. They have a characteristic skull shape and dentition. 
Suborder: Feliformia
Family: Felidae (cats)
Subfamily: Felinae
Genus: Felis
 African wildcat, Felis lybica LC
Family: Viverridae (civets)
Subfamily: Viverrinae
Genus: Genetta
 Common genet, Genetta genetta LR/lc
Family: Herpestidae (mongooses)
Genus: Herpestes
 Egyptian mongoose, Herpestes ichneumon LR/lc
Suborder: Caniformia
Family: Canidae (dogs, foxes)
Genus: Vulpes
 Red fox, Vulpes vulpes LC
Family: Mustelidae (mustelids)
Genus: Mustela
 Least weasel, Mustela nivalis LR/lc
Family: Phocidae (earless seals)
Genus: Monachus
 Mediterranean monk seal, Monachus monachus CR

Order: Artiodactyla (even-toed ungulates)

The even-toed ungulates are ungulates whose weight is borne about equally by the third and fourth toes, rather than mostly or entirely by the third as in perissodactyls. There are about 220 artiodactyl species, including many that are of great economic importance to humans.

Family: Suidae (pigs)
Subfamily: Suinae
Genus: Sus
 Wild boar, Sus scrofa LR/lc
 North African boar, Sus scrofa algira

Locally extinct 
The following species are locally extinct in the area but continue to exist elsewhere:
African golden wolf, Canis anthus

See also
List of chordate orders
Lists of mammals by region
List of prehistoric mammals
Mammal classification
List of mammals described in the 2000s

Notes

References
 

 Palomo, L.J. et al. (2007) Atlas y Libro Rojo de los Mamíferos Terrestres de España. Dirección General para la Biodiversidad-SECEM-SECEMU, Madrid, 588pp.
 Purroy, F.J. and Varela, J.M. (2003) Guía de los Mamíferos de España. Península, Baleares y Canarias. Lynx Edicions, Barcelona.

'Ceuta
Ceuta, Melilla and the Plazas de Soberanía
Ceuta, Melilla and the Plazas de Soberanía